Crematogaster australis is a species of ant in tribe Crematogastrini. It was described by Mayr in 1876. The species is native to Australia, as the name australis suggests.

References

australis
Insects described in 1876